Down the Drain is a 1990 American comedy film. It was directed by Robert C. Hughes and starred Andrew Stevens, Teri Copley and John Matuszak, in his last film after his death. Jerry Mathers and Stella Stevens also appeared in the film. It was released on video April 25, 1990.

Plot
A crooked lawyer brings together some of the clients he's gotten off and schemes to rob a bank vault. However, after the robbery, he discovers that the "goods" he's stolen is actually a top-secret microchip that foreign powers are after, and they will stop at nothing to get it.

References

External links

1990 films
1990 comedy films
American comedy films
1990s English-language films
1990s American films